Pierre Chevalier may refer to:

Pierre Chevalier (caver) (1905–2001), French caver, mountaineer and explorer
Pierre Chevalier (director) (1915–2005), French film director
Pierre Chevalier (politician) (born 1952), Belgian politician
Pierre Michel François Chevalier (1818–1863), Breton nationalist author